.gp is the country code top-level domain (ccTLD) for Guadeloupe. Pricing differs for Guadeloupians compared to other Internet users.

Registrations can be made directly at the second level, or at the third level beneath .com.gp, .net.gp, .edu.gp, .asso.gp, or .org.gp. Two digits numbers are accepted for registration.

NIC.GP has been a member of LACTLD since August 2019.

See also
 Internet in Guadeloupe
 Internet in France
 ISO 3166-2:GP
 .fr –CC TLD for the Republic of France
 .eu –CC TLD for the European Union

References

External links
 IANA .gp whois information
 .gp domain registration website 
 

Country code top-level domains
Communications in Guadeloupe
Communications in Saint Barthélemy
Communications in the Collectivity of Saint Martin

sv:Toppdomän#G